The Boston Red Sox are a Major League Baseball (MLB) team based in Boston, Massachusetts. From  to the present, the Red Sox have played in Fenway Park. The "Red Sox" name originates from the iconic uniform feature. They are sometimes nicknamed the "BoSox", a combination of "Boston" and "Sox" (as opposed to the "ChiSox"), the "Crimson Hose", and "the Olde Towne Team". Most fans simply refer to them as the Sox.

Every home game from May 15, 2003, through April 10, 2013, was sold out—a span of 820 games over nearly ten years.

Year by year

Regular season record by decade 
The number of regular season games scheduled each season has varied over time, from as low as 140 to the current 162, which has been in place since 1961.

Not all scheduled games are played each season, for reasons such as work stoppages or, infrequently, rained-out games that are not rescheduled. Prior to the delayed-start  season, when teams played a reduced schedule of 60 games and only faced opponents within their own division, the most recent season during which the Red Sox did not play a full 162-game schedule was 2001, when they played 161 games.

Source:

All-time records

Note: updated through the conclusion of the team's 2022 season.

Notes
 For all American League pennant winners see List of American League pennant winners
 The World Series was canceled after the New York Giants refused to play.
 The season was partially canceled due to a players' strike that lasted 50 days.
 The season was partially canceled due to a players' strike that lasted 223 days.
 The Red Sox finished 95–67 and with the same record as the New York Yankees, but since the Yankees had won the season series between the two teams, they won the American League East and the Red Sox had to settle for the American League Wild Card.

References

External links
 Red Sox Year-By-Year Results at MLB.com
 Red Sox Postseason Results at MLB.com

Boston Red Sox
seasons